Rosalinda López Hernández (born August 12, 1967 in  Cárdenas, Tabasco, Mexico). She is a Bachelor of Public Accounting and a Mexican politician. She has been a local deputy, federal deputy and senator for Tabasco. Currently she is the General Administrator of Fiscal Audit of the SAT.

Biography 
Rosalinda López Hernández was born on August 12, 1967 in  Cárdenas, Tabasco, Mexico. Rosalinda López Hernández is a public accountant graduated from the Universidad Juárez Autónoma de Tabasco and has a master's degree in Economic, Financial and Accounting Auditing from the Autonomous University of Madrid.

Career 

In 1989, she was the University Counselor of the Universidad Juárez Autónoma de Tabasco. She was the Militant, State Councilor and National Councilor of the Party of the Democratic Revolution. 

Frontera 1992 to 1993, she was a Member of the Fiscal Commission of the Employers' Confederation of the Mexican Republic Coparmex Delegation of Tabasco. 

From 2000 to 2003, she was a Federal Deputy for the IV Federal Electoral District of Tabasco to the LVIII Legislature of the Congress of the Union of Mexico. The Congress of the Union where she served as secretary of the Finance and Public Credit Commission, in addition to being a Member of the Oversight Committee of the Superior Auditor of the Federation and Member of the Committee of the Center for Public Finance Studies. 

From 2003 to 2006, she was a Deputy to the Congress of Tabasco. She served as President of the Finance and Budget Commission, Member of the Governance and Constitutional Points Commission and Member of the First Treasury Inspection Commission. 

From 2006 to 2012, she was a Senator for Tabasco nominated by the Coalition for the Good of All in second formula. Where she was part of the Commissions on Regulations and Parliamentary Practices Population and Development, Social Security, Finance and Public Credit and Hydraulic Resources. During the LX Legislature she participated in the Foreign Relations Commission and served as Coordinator of the International Area of the PRD Parliamentary Group in the Senate of the Republic.

References

1967 births
Living people
Politicians from Tabasco
People from Cárdenas, Tabasco
Women members of the Senate of the Republic (Mexico)
Members of the Senate of the Republic (Mexico)
Members of the Chamber of Deputies (Mexico)
Institutional Revolutionary Party politicians
21st-century Mexican politicians
21st-century Mexican women politicians
Women members of the Chamber of Deputies (Mexico)